Mary Jean Ramirez Lastimosa (born 23 November 1987), also known as MJ Lastimosa, is a Filipino model, host, actress, TV presenter and beauty pageant titleholder who was crowned Miss Universe Philippines 2014. She represented the Philippines at the Miss Universe 2014 pageant and finished as a Top 10 semifinalist.

Early life and education
Lastimosa was born to an Arab father and a Filipino mother. She finished her Computer Engineering degree with honors at the University of Mindanao in Davao City. She participated in various local pageants, winning Davao’s Loveliest in 2005, Mutya ng University of Mindanao in 2006, Miss Regional and Miss National PRISAA in 2007, and again Mutya ng Davao and Reyna ng Aliwan in 2008 prior to her Binibining Pilipinas stints.

Pageantry

Binibining Pilipinas 2011

In 2011, Lastimosa placed 2nd Runner-Up in the Binibining Pilipinas 2011 pageant. Shamcey Supsup won the said pageant.

Binibining Pilipinas 2012

In 2012, Lastimosa once again entered the pageant where she finished as a Top 12 finalist and also bagged the Miss Philippine Airlines and Miss Avon Philippines awards. Janine Tugonon won the said pageant.

Binibining Pilipinas 2014

Lastimosa joined Binibining Pilipinas 2014 and won the title of Miss Universe Philippines 2014 after her third attempt, gaining the right to represent the Philippines at the Miss Universe 2014 pageant.

During the question and answer portion of the pageant, she was asked by Miss Universe 2013, Gabriela Isler: "March is the women’s month. For you, what is the greatest advantage of being a woman?" She responded:
"The greatest advantage of being a woman is being able to compose herself. Just like here, we're standing in front of thousands of people, not knowing if you're going to cheer for us or boo us. But we try to compose ourselves. We keep the emotions and show the beauty that is in us and tonight, thousands of people are standing here, celebrating the beauty of women."

At the end of the event, she was crowned as Miss Universe Philippines 2014 along with the Best in Swimsuit award.

On March 15, 2015, Lastimosa crowned Pia Wurtzbach as her successor at the Binibining Pilipinas 2015 pageant held at the Smart Araneta Coliseum in Quezon City, Philippines.

Miss Universe 2014

Lastimosa competed in Miss Universe 2014 in Doral, Florida, United States, where she finished as a Top 10 semifinalist, continuing the placement streak of the Philippines in Miss Universe. Paulina Vega of Colombia won the said pageant.

Filmography

Television

Film

References

External links
Official Bb. Pilipinas website

1987 births
Living people
Binibining Pilipinas winners
Filipino people of Arab descent
Miss Universe 2014 contestants